The 2005 European Women Basketball Championship, commonly called Eurobasket 2005 Women, was held in Turkey between 2 September and 11 September 2005. Czech Republic won the gold medal and Russia the silver medal while Spain won the bronze. Maria Stepanova from Russia was named the tournament MVP.

The FIBA European Women’s Basketball Championship is a bi-annual women’s basketball competition between national teams organised by FIBA Europe, the sport's governing body in Europe. This was the first time that the championship was hosted by Turkey.

Venues

Ankara
Ankara, the capital of Turkey and the country’s second largest city, was the final stage of the Eurobasket 2005 Women action. The Ankara Atatürk Sport Hall with a capacity of 4,500 people hosted 16 games of the competition following the preliminary round.

Bursa
Turkey’s fourth most populous city Bursa was home to Group A during the tournament, and also had a total of 15 games played in the 3,500 person capacity Bursa Atatürk Sport Hall.

Izmir
Izmir is the third largest city of Turkey.  İzmir Atatürk Sport Hall with a capacity of 3,000 persons hosted Group B, where 15 games were played.

Qualification
For details on qualification, see Eurobasket 2005 Women qualification.

Squads

Final round

Preliminaries

Group A – Atatürk Sport Hall, Bursa

|}

Group B – Atatürk Sport Hall, Izmir

|}

Finals – Atatürk Sport Hall, Ankara

5th to 8th place

9th to 12th place

Quarter-finals

Classification 9–12

Classification 5–8

Semi-finals

Finals

Conclusion

Final standings

|-
|||align=left|||8||8||0||576||437||+139||16
|-
|||align=left|||8||5||3||618||557||+61||13
|-
|||align=left|||8||6||2||615||511||+104||14
|-
|4||align=left|||8||5||3||584||551||+33||13
|-
|colspan=10 height=1px bgcolor=lightgrey|
|-
|5||align=left|||8||6||2||559||485||+74||14
|-
|6||align=left|||8||4||4||516||551||–35||12
|-
|7||align=left|||8||3||5||508||538||–30||11
|-
|8||align=left|||8||2||6||583||633||–50||10
|-
|colspan=10 height=1px bgcolor=lightgrey|
|-
|9||align=left|||7||4||3||482||482||0||11
|-
|10||align=left|||7||2||5||404||468||–64||9
|-
|11||align=left|||7||1||6||437||501||–64||8
|-
|12||align=left|||7||0||7||408||576||–168||7
|}

All-Eurobasket 2005 Women Awards
 MVP: Maria Stepanova ( Russia)
 Best Center: Maria Stepanova ( Russia)
 Best Forward: Amaya Valdemoro  ( Spain)
 Best Guard: Hana Machová  (  Czech Republic)

1st Team
 Maria Stepanova ( Russia)
 Tatiana Shchegoleva ( Russia)
 Amaya Valdemoro ( Spain)
 Hana Machová (  Czech Republic)
 Eva Vítecková (  Czech Republic)

2nd Team
 Anna Montañana ( Spain)
 Agnieszka Bibrzycka ( Poland)
 Sandra Valužytė ( Lithuania)
 Anete Jekabsone ( Latvia)
 Audrey Sauret-Gillespie ( France)

Honorable Mention
 Michaela Pavlícková (  Czech Republic)
 Eva Nemcová (  Czech Republic)
 Ilona Korstin ( Russia)
 Marta Fernández ( Spain)
 Iveta Marcauskaite ( Lithuania)
 Sandra Le Dréan ( France)
 Nevriye Yılmaz ( Turkey)
 Ivana Matović ( Serbia and Montenegro)
 Biljana Stanković ( Serbia and Montenegro)
 Evanthia Maltsi ( Greece)
 Linda Fröhlich ( Germany)

Top 10 scorers

Statistical leaders

References
 Eurobasket 2005 Women official website
 Eurobasket 2005 Women at Eurobasket official website

External links
 FIBA Europe official website
 FIBA official website

 
2005
2005–06 in European women's basketball
2005 EuroBasket Women
2005 EuroBasket Women
2005 EuroBasket Women
Euro
Euro
September 2005 sports events in Europe
2005 in Turkish women's sport
2000s in Ankara
2000s in İzmir